Central of Georgia Depot and Trainshed is a former passenger depot and trainshed constructed in 1860 by the Central of Georgia Railway (CofG) before the outbreak of the American Civil War. This pair of buildings was declared a National Historic Landmark in 1976, a listing that was expanded in 1978 to the old Central of Georgia Railway Savannah Shops and Terminal Facilities.

Located on the northwest corner of Martin Luther King Jr. Boulevard and Louisville Road in the city's historic downtown, the red brick passenger terminal of the CofG complex houses the Savannah Visitor Center and the Savannah History Museum. The site complex includes several notable structures, including cotton yard, a blacksmith shop, a brick viaduct and the trainshed, as well as an office car and caboose. It is owned by the Coastal Heritage Society, a non-profit organization dedicated to preserving the cultural heritage of coastal Georgia and adjacent regions.

The Savannah History Museum is located at 303 Martin Luther King, Jr. Boulevard (Georgia State Route 25 Connector).  The museum is housed inside the old passenger terminal.  It contains artifacts and exhibits relating to the history of Savannah from its establishment to the current time. The shops and terminal facilities were listed separately on June 2, 1978, and the Coastal Heritage Society opened the museum on the site in 1989.

Passenger trains in the station 
The Central of Georgia operated several trains to the station, on an Atlanta (Terminal Station) - Macon (Terminal Station) - Savannah itinerary. The last of these was the Nancy Hanks II, operating to 1971, when Amtrak assumed most passenger train operations in the United States.

References

External links

Savannah History Museum – Coastal Heritage Society
Savannah Visitors Center Locations – Visit Savannah
Central of Georgia Passenger Station in Savannah (RailGeorgia.com)
Historic American Engineering Record (HAER) documentation, filed under Savannah, Chatham County, GA:

Railway stations on the National Register of Historic Places in Georgia (U.S. state)
Historic American Engineering Record in Georgia (U.S. state)
Railway stations in the United States opened in 1860
Savannah
Former railway stations in Georgia (U.S. state)
Railroad-related National Historic Landmarks
Museums in Savannah, Georgia
History museums in Georgia (U.S. state)
National Register of Historic Places in Savannah, Georgia
Railway buildings and structures on the National Register of Historic Places in Georgia (U.S. state)
Industrial buildings and structures on the National Register of Historic Places in Georgia (U.S. state)
Blacksmith shops
Repurposed railway stations in the United States